Mikhail Ilyich Romm (– 1 November 1971) was a Soviet filmmaker. He was awarded the title of People's Artist of the USSR in 1950.

Life and career

Early life 
He was born in Irkutsk into a family of mixed Russian Jewish and Russian German descent. He graduated from gymnasium in 1917 and entered the Moscow College for Painting, Sculpture and Architecture. From 1918 - 1921, he served in the Red Army during the Russian Civil War, first as a signalman and later rising to the rank of inspector of a Special Commission concerning the numbers of the Red Army and Fleet (Russian: Особая комиссия по вопросам численности Красной Армии и Флота) of the Field Staff of the Supreme Military Soviet of the Republic (Полевой штаб Реввоенсовета Республики). As such he traveled a lot and had the opportunity to see much of the life in different parts of the country, something that he later said he "recalled with gratitude".

After the end of his military career, Romm received a scholarship from the Soviet government. In 1925 he graduated as a sculptor from the class of Anna Golubkina of the Highest Artistic-Technical Institute and worked as a sculptor and translator. In 1928-1930 he conducted research on the theory of cinema in the Institute for the methods of extra-scholastic work (Institut metodov vneshkol'noy raboty). From 1931 he worked at the Mosfilm studio, first as an assistant, and screen writer.

In October 1934, he co-signed a collective letter to Joseph Stalin from workers in the cinema industry, declaring that "we work in different ways... but we are all inspired with a general desire to express the ideas that inspire the best part of mankind, the ideas of Marx and Lenin, the ideas of the brilliant Leader of the most outstanding and revolutionary party: Joseph Vissarionovich Stalin."

Film career 
Romm's first film, Pishka (Dumpling, 1934) was a silent version of Guy de Maupassant's story Boule de Suif. Next he began work on a film version of The Queen of Spades, which he intended to have ready in time for the centenary of the death of its author, the poet Alexander Pushkin. and which was to include large sections of wordless pantomime. In 1936, he commissioned Sergei Prokofiev to write the incidental music. At the same time, he was making another film, Anka. This project embroiled him in a dispute with the deputy head of Mosfilm, Yelena Sokolovskaya, and was never completed. He then accepted a commission to make The Thirteen, a Soviet version of the 1934 American film The Lost Patrol, directed by John Ford. Romm's version was shot in the desert in Turkmenistan.

After the release of The Thirteen in May 1937, Romm returned to work on The Queen of Spades. but was ordered by the head of the film industry, Boris Shumyatsky to break off and make Lenin in October, which he was required to finish in four months, in time for the 20th anniversary of the Bolshevik revolution. While he was working on the screen play, which coincided with the Great Purge, he stayed in the Moscow flat of an assistant director of Mosfilm, Albert Slivkin. On 3 August, uniformed NKVD officers raided the flat and arrested Slivkin, who was shot the following March. Despite that, Romm completed the film in time for Stalin to have a private viewing on 6 November 1937, just before its release. He then returned, again, to work on The Queen of Spades, but in 1938, the project was terminated by the new head of the cinema industry, Semyon Dukelsky, a former NKVD officer whom Romm later described as "an idiot, a son of a bitch... a cretin, a dog."

In 1940-1943 he was an artistic leader for the Mosfilm films production. In 1942-1947 he was the director of a theater studio for movie actors. From 1938 he was a lecturer, from 1948 he was the leader of the actor's-producer department of the VGIK, professor (from 1962). He influenced many prominent film-directors, including Andrei Tarkovsky, Grigory Chukhray, Vasily Shukshin, Nikita Mikhalkov, Georgiy Daneliya, Alexander Mitta, Igor Talankin, Revaz Chkheidze, Gleb Panfilov, Vladimir Basov, Tengiz Abuladze, Elem Klimov and many others.

Dream (Mechta) (1941) starring Faina Ranevskaya and other famous actors is considered one of the high points of Romm's career. The film reveals deep spiritual crises, material and spiritual misery of inhabitants of a hostel titled Dream (Mechta). President Roosevelt said it was one of the greatest films in the world.

Another prominent film of Romm's was about young nuclear physicists; Nine Days in One Year (1962). The documentary Triumph Over Violence, (aka Ordinary Fascism) (1965) about the Third Reich gained over forty million viewers. No other historic documentary won such a numerous audience.

He wrote many books and articles on the theory of cinematographic art, and also memoirs. He was awarded the Stalin Prize 5 times (1941, 1946, 1948, 1949, 1951). Romm was an honorary corresponding member of the Academy of the skills of DDR (1967).

He died in Moscow in 1971.

Filmography
Boule de Suif (Пышка) (1934)
The Thirteen (Тринадцать) (1936)
Lenin in October (1937); co-directed with Dmitri Vasilyev
Lenin in 1918 (1939)
Dream (Мечта) (1941)
Girl No. 217 (1945)
The Russian Question (Русский вопрос) (1947)
Vladimir Ilyich Lenin (Владимир Ильич Ленин) (1949); documentary, co-directed with Vasily Belyaev
Secret Mission (Секретная миссия) (1950)
Attack from the Sea (Корабли штурмуют бастионы) (1953)
Admiral Ushakov (Адмирал Ушаков) (1953)
Murder on Dante Street (Убийство на улице Данте) (1956)
A Lesson in History (Урок истории) (1957); co-directed with Lev Arnshtam and Hristo Piskov
Lenin Is Alive (Живой Ленин) (1958); documentary
Nine Days in One Year (1962)
Boris Shchukin (Борис Щукин) (1963); documentary
Triumph Over Violence (Обыкновенный фашизм) (1965); documentary
First Pages (Первые страницы) (1970); documentary
And Still I Believe... (И все-таки я верю...) (1974); documentary, finished by Elem Klimov, Marlen Khutsiev and German Lavrov

References

External links

Mikhail Romm. Film director and Teacher
Mikhail Romm on Film Directors (translated from Russian)
Mikhail Romm on Different Types of Cinematic Shots (translated from Russian)

1901 births
1971 deaths
Academic staff of the Gerasimov Institute of Cinematography
Academic staff of High Courses for Scriptwriters and Film Directors
People's Artists of the USSR
Stalin Prize winners
Recipients of the Order of Lenin
Recipients of the Order of the Red Banner of Labour
Recipients of the Vasilyev Brothers State Prize of the RSFSR
Russian film directors
Russian Jews
Soviet film directors
Burials at Novodevichy Cemetery